The Philippines suffers from widespread corruption, which developed during the Spanish colonial period. According to GAN Integrity's Philippines Corruption Report updated May 2020, the Philippines suffers from many incidents of corruption and crime in many aspects of civic life and in various sectors. Such corruption risks are rampant throughout the state's judicial system, police service, public services, land administration, and natural resources. Examples of corruption in the Philippines include graft, bribery, favouritism, nepotism, impunity, embezzlement, extortion, racketeering, fraud, tax evasion, lack of transparency, lack of sufficient enforcement of laws and government policies, and consistent lack of support for human rights.

Perceived decline
Transparency International's 2021 Corruption Perception Index (CPI) ranks the country (together with Algeria, Egypt, Zambia, and Nepal) in the 117th place out of 180 countries. A high rank corresponds to a perception of high corruption in the country's public sector.

The countries in the CPI are ranked according to their CPI score, which measures the perceived level of public sector corruption on a scale of 0100, where 0 means that a country is perceived as extremely corrupt and 100 means that a country is perceived as very clean. The Philippines received a score of 33 in 2021; the highest score in the Index that year was 88 and the lowest, 11.

In 2012, President Benigno Aquino said that, according to Transparency International, the factors driving the progress in the Philippines' Corruption Perception Index scores at that time were improved government service and reduced red tape.

A November 2020 Transparency International survey of nearly 20,000 citizens from 17 countries, mostly between June and September 2020, showed that more Filipinos are confident in the government's tackling of corruption compared with Asian neighbors, although they also believe corruption in government remains a big problem. 64% of Philippine respondents think that corruption has decreased in the last 12 months, while 24% believe that it increased. This was better than the average across Asia, where only 32% believe that corruption decreased and 38% said that it increased.

Corruption in the police service 
The Police System of the Philippines poses a high risk of corruption, with the Philippines National Police (PNP) considered to be one of the most corrupt institutions within the country. There are several reports of national police officers and members of the military engaging in criminal activities such as extortion, corruption and involvement in local rackets. Private businesses also report that they cannot solely rely on the support of the police and half of them choose to pay for private security. 

According to CNN Philippines, Police Commissioner Mr. Sombero was under investigation in a corruption case for allegedly facilitating a PHP 50 million bribe from gambling tycoon Jack Lam, who tried to bribe immigration authorities to release approximately 1,300 Chinese nationals who were working in his resorts illegally.

Corruption in the judicial system 
Corruption in the Philippine judicial system is also a major problem. Bribery and irregular payments in return for favourable judicial decisions are quite common. Although judicial officials are independent by law, rich and powerful groups and individuals wield control and influence over the judicial system and influence the outcomes of civil and criminal proceedings. Financial investment dispute often take an unnecessarily long period of time due to staffing shortages, lack of resources, and corruption in the court system. The low salaries of judicial officials help exacerbate the problem of bribery in exchange for favours. The judiciary is also criticised for making non-transparent and biased judicial decisions.

Political nepotism

The Philippine political arena is mainly arranged and operated by families or alliances of families, rather than organized around the voting for political parties. Called the padrino system, one gains favor, promotion, or political appointment through family affiliation (nepotism) or friendship (cronyism), as opposed to one's merit. The padrino system has been the source of many controversies and corruption in the Philippines.

According to the Civil Service Commission (CSC), nepotism is a form of corruption or abuse of authority that violates Article IX (B), Section 2 (2) of the Constitution that states that "Appointments in the civil service shall be made only according to merit and fitness to be determined, as far as practicable, and, except to positions which are policy-determining, primarily confidential, or highly technical, by competitive examination." Nepotism favors a few individuals and compromises fairness in the hiring and promotion process in government.

See also
Human rights in the Philippines
Extrajudicial killings and forced disappearances in the Philippines
List of political scandals in the Philippines
Philippines Truth Commission
Unexplained wealth of the Marcos family

General
 Crime in the Philippines
 International Anti-Corruption Academy
 Group of States Against Corruption
 International Anti-Corruption Day
 ISO 37001 Anti-bribery management systems
 United Nations Convention against Corruption
 OECD Anti-Bribery Convention
 Transparency International

References

Further reading
Philippines Corruption Profile from the Business Anti-Corruption Portal
 Philippines corruption profile, Transparency International
 

 
Politics of the Philippines by issue
Philippines